Thor Inge Fossen (born 3 January 1963) is a Norwegian cyberneticist. Fossen received the MSc degree in Marine Technology (1987) and PhD in Engineering Cybernetics (1991) both from the Norwegian University of Science and Technology (NTNU). He is a Fulbright alumni and he pursued postgraduate studies in Aerodynamics and Aeronautics at the Department of Aeronautics and Astronautics of the University of Washington, Seattle (1989-1990). At age 28 he was appointed associated professor of guidance, navigation and control at NTNU and two years later he qualified as full professor. He has been elected member of the Norwegian Academy of Technological Sciences since 1998 and elevated to IEEE Fellow (2016) for his contributions to modeling and controlling of marine craft. Fossen is one of the founders of the company Marine Cybernetics (2002), which was acquired by DNV GL in 2014. He is co-founder of the company SCOUT Drone Inspection AS (2017) and he is involved in several new high-tech companies in Trondheim. He is currently co-director of the NTNU Center for Autonomous Marine Operations and Systems. He has made contributions in the areas of marine craft motion control systems, hydrodynamics, control theory, guidance systems and navigation.

Fields of research
Fossen's field of research is control theory, computer science, navigation and marine hydrodynamics. He has published approximately 400 papers on guidance, navigation and control (GNC), vehicle dynamics, and control systems for ships, underwater vehicles and unmanned vehicles.  He has authored three textbooks. The first textbook  has become the standard reference in marine control systems. This book was followed up by two textbooks  and  The mathematical models for marine craft GNC systems are based on a robot-inspired model representation first published in 1991. Fossen's marine craft and ocean vehicle models have become a standard for marine craft motion control systems design. In addition to the three textbooks, Fossen has co-authored three editorials, and

External links

References

Academic staff of the Norwegian University of Science and Technology
1963 births
Living people
20th-century Norwegian scientists
21st-century Norwegian scientists
20th-century Norwegian educators
21st-century Norwegian educators
Fellow Members of the IEEE